The FIS Alpine World Ski Championships 1933 in alpine skiing were the third edition of the competition, organized by the International Ski Federation (FIS) and held in Innsbruck, Austria in February 1933.

Men's events

Women's events

Medal table

See also
Austria at the FIS Alpine World Ski Championships 1933
Italy at the FIS Alpine World Ski Championships 1933

References

1933 in alpine skiing
1933 in Austrian sport
1933
International sports competitions hosted by Austria
Alpine skiing competitions in Austria
February 1933 sports events
Sports competitions in Innsbruck
20th century in Innsbruck